Devonald v Rosser & Sons [1906] 2 KB 728 is a UK labour law case concerning the contract of employment. It held that an implied term of employment contracts is that when there is no work available to be done, the employer must bear the risk by continuing to pay wages.

Facts
In a test case, Mr Devonald was a tinplate rollerman at Rosser & Sons’ factory in Cilfrew, South Wales. He was paid for each completed box of 112 tin plates. His contract said he was required to do the tasks set by the employer and that he would get 28 days' notice before termination. Unfortunately, tinplates were in decline and the employer announced the plant would close in two weeks. There was a six-week period, therefore, when the employer gave no work. The question was whether the employer had to pay, given that payment was really according to piece.

Judgment
Lord Alverston CJ held that the employee did not bear the risk of plant closure.

See also

UK labour law
Employment contract in English law
Autoclenz Ltd v Belcher [2011] UKSC 41

Notes

References

United Kingdom labour case law
Court of Appeal (England and Wales) cases
1906 in case law
1906 in British law
United Kingdom employment contract case law